Sound and Fury may refer to:

Books
 "Sound and fury", a line from the "Tomorrow and tomorrow and tomorrow" soliloquy in William Shakespeare's Macbeth
The Sound and the Fury, William Faulkner

Film and TV
 De bruit et de fureur, a 1988 film by Jean-Claude Brisseau
 Sound and Fury (film), 2000 documentary on deaf children and cochlear implants
 Sound & Fury, a 2019 Netflix anime film that was made to accompany Sound & Fury (Sturgill Simpson album)
The Sound and the Fury (1959 film) American drama film directed by Martin Ritt. It is loosely based on the 1929 novel of the same name by William Faulkner
The Sound and the Fury (2014 film) American drama film directed by James Franco. It is the second film version of the 1929 novel of the same name

Music
The Sound and the Fury (ensemble), project of tenor John Potter
 Sound & Fury (1982 album), by Youth Brigade
 Sound & Fury (1983 album), by Youth Brigade
 Sound & Fury (Sturgill Simpson album) 2019
 The Sound and the Fury (album) by British singer-songwriter Nerina Pallot 2015

See also
The Sound and the Fury (disambiguation)
The Sound of Fury (disambiguation)